The 1974 Boston Red Sox season was the 74th season in the franchise's Major League Baseball history. The Red Sox finished third in the American League East with a record of 84 wins and 78 losses, seven games behind the Baltimore Orioles.

Offseason 
 October 24, 1973: Marty Pattin was traded by the Red Sox to the Kansas City Royals for Dick Drago.
 December 7, 1973: Juan Marichal was purchased by the Red Sox from the San Francisco Giants.
 December 7, 1973: Lynn McGlothen, John Curtis, and Mike Garman were traded by the Red Sox to the St. Louis Cardinals for Diego Seguí, Reggie Cleveland and Terry Hughes.
 March 26, 1974: Orlando Cepeda was released by the Red Sox.

Regular season

Season summary

The injury bug struck Boston 
Two calamities befell the Red Sox in 1974, and they would work to make the year a disappointing one and let the team get the nickname of "chokers". First Carlton Fisk, who appeared to be ready for greatness, tore up his left knee while blocking the plate in a June 28 game against the Cleveland Indians at Cleveland. He had surgery and was out for the rest of the season. Catching, meant to be a Sox strongpoint, became a weak one instead. Then Rick Wise, who was expected to join with Luis Tiant and Bill Lee to give the Sox a solid 1–2–3 punch on the mound, missed much of the early part of the season with a shoulder injury, and when he was coming back from that he broke a finger when his wife accidentally closed a door on his hand. He ended up at 3–4 with Boston in 1974.

Falling short again 
Despite the injuries, the team persevered, actually holding a seven-game lead as of August 23. After that, the Sox went into an incredible slump, losing 24 of the final 38 games and dropping all the way to third. As late as August 29, they were still up on the second place New York Yankees by 4 and the Baltimore Orioles by 8. Boston lost 8 in a row, including an infamous Labor Day doubleheader to the streaking Orioles, both games by the score of 1–0. Boston finished the season seven games behind the division-winning Orioles and five behind second-place New York.

As a team they batted .203 over their last 33 games. Boston fans were livid, and some said that the Sox had been playing over their heads all along and that it had finally caught up with them, especially when they lacked Fisk and Wise. Boston licked its wounds, taking some consolation from Carl Yastrzemski's .301 average, with 15 homers and 79 RBIs. Dwight Evans had a .281 average, 10 homers and 70 RBIs. There were 22 wins for Tiant and 17 for Bill Lee. Twice in three years, the Red Sox fans thought they had the pennant, and twice the team had failed them.

Season standings

Record vs. opponents

Opening Day lineup 

Source:

Roster

Statistical leaders 

Source:

Batting 

Source:

Pitching 

Source:

Farm system 

Source:

References

External links 
1974 Boston Red Sox team page at Baseball Reference
1974 Boston Red Sox season at baseball-almanac.com

Boston Red Sox seasons
Boston Red Sox
Boston Red Sox
Red Sox